Jessie Aney and Anna Sisková were the defending champions but chose not to participate.

Giulia Gatto-Monticone and Sada Nahimana won the title, defeating Ilona Georgiana Ghioroaie and Oana Georgeta Simion in the final, 6–1, 1–6, [10–5].

Seeds

Draw

Draw

References

External Links
Main Draw

ITS Cup - Doubles